Charles Fenton Mercer Spotswood Quinby (October 6, 1899 – January 4, 1988) was an American competition swimmer who represented the United States at the 1920 Summer Olympics in Antwerp, Belgium.  Quinby competed in the qualifying heats of the men's 400-meter breaststroke; he finished fourth in his heat but did not advance.

See also
 List of United States Naval Academy alumni

References

External links
 

1899 births
1988 deaths
American male breaststroke swimmers
Navy Midshipmen men's swimmers
Olympic swimmers of the United States
Sportspeople from Norfolk, Virginia
Swimmers at the 1920 Summer Olympics
20th-century American people